Sima Yue (司馬越) (died 23 April 311), courtesy name Yuanchao (元超), formally Prince Xiaoxian of Donghai (東海孝獻王), was a Western Jin imperial prince and regent for Emperor Hui and Emperor Huai.  He was the eighth of eight princes commonly associated with the War of the Eight Princes.

Early career
Sima Yue was a son of Sima Tai (司馬泰), Prince Wenxian of Gaomi (高密文献王), who was a son of Sima Yi's brother Sima Kui (司馬馗), making Yue a cousin of Jin's founding emperor Emperor Wu. On 30 September 291, early in Emperor Hui's reign, he was created the Prince of Donghai.  During the early parts of the War of the Eight Princes, he held a number of offices in the capital Luoyang.

In early 304, when the regent Sima Ai the Prince of Changsha (Emperor Hui's brother) was battling the forces of Sima Ying the Prince of Chengdu (also Emperor Hui's brother) and Sima Yong the Prince of Hejian (grandson of Emperor Hui's great-granduncle Sima Fu, Prince Xian of Anping [安平献王]), even though Sima Ai was fighting off the overwhelming force that Sima Ying and Sima Yong had, Sima Yue became convinced that a victory was impossible, and he seized Sima Ai and delivered him to Sima Yong's general Zhang Fang (張方), who executed Sima Ai cruelly by burning him to death.  Sima Ying controlled the government remotely, with Sima Yue being one of the generals who stayed in Luoyang to execute Sima Ying's orders.

Campaigns against Sima Ying and Sima Yong

As Sima Ying continued to remotely control the government from his stronghold of Yecheng (鄴城, in modern Handan, Hebei) as both regent and crown prince, the officials in Luoyang tired of the situation.  Later in 304, Sima Yue led them in a rebellion against Sima Ying's forces, and he took Emperor Hui with him on the campaign.  After some initial hesitation, Sima Ying fought and defeated Sima Yue's forces, forcing Sima Yue to flee.  Emperor Hui was captured and taken to Yecheng.  Subsequently, however, Sima Ying was defeated by Wang Jun (王浚), the commander of the forces of You Province (幽州, modern Beijing, Tianjin, and northern Hebei) and fled to Luoyang without his troops.  Sima Yong then seized control of the government and Emperor Hui, deposing Sima Ying from his position as crown prince and replacing him with another brother of Emperor Hui's, Sima Chi the Prince of Yuzhang.  In late 304, he further had Zhang forcibly move Emperor Hui and Crown Prince Chi to Chang'an, under his firm control.

Sima Yue decided to act against Sima Yong.  In fall 305, he declared a rebellion with the stated intention of returning Emperor Hui to Luoyang.  The warlords of the empire were forced to take sides, but eventually they generally fell into line behind Sima Yue because they were disgusted with Zhang's cruelty.  The battles were initially largely indecisive, but early 306, after Sima Yue had some minor victories over Sima Yong's forces, Sima Yong panicked and killed Zhang, seeking peace with Sima Yue.  Sima Yue refused, and by later that year was able to force Sima Yong to abandon both Emperor Hui and Chang'an.  Sima Yue welcomed Emperor Hui back to the capital Luoyang.  Early in 307, Emperor Hui was poisoned to death, and historians generally agreed that the poisoning was done at Sima Yue's orders, but the motive was unclear.  Crown Prince Chi ascended to the throne as Emperor Huai.

Domination over Emperor Huai
Emperor Huai, in contrast with the developmentally disabled Emperor Hui, was intelligent and astute, and he sought to revive the war-ravaged empire, but Sima Yue maintained a tight grip on authority and would not allow the emperor much actual power.  In spring 307, he left Luoyang and set up headquarters at Xuchang (許昌, in modern Xuchang, Henan), but continued to control the government remotely.  Later that year, at the urging of his wife Princess Pei, he issued an order that appeared insignificant at the time but would turn out to be important later on—making Sima Rui the Prince of Langye be in charge of Yang Province (揚州, modern Zhejiang and southern Jiangsu and Anhui), at the post of Jianye (建業, in modern Nanjing, Jiangsu); this was the post from which Sima Rui would later, after the fall of Luoyang and Chang'an to Han Zhao, claim the Jin imperial title.

In 309, Sima Yue, concerned about the growing use of authority that Emperor Huai was exerting, made a sudden return to Luoyang and arrested and executed a number of Emperor Huai's associates, including Emperor Huai's uncle Wang Yan (王延).  Other than privately mourning them, there was nothing that Emperor Huai could do.  Sima Yue further disbanded the imperial guards and put his own personal forces in charge of protecting the emperor.

For all of Sima Yue's assertion of authority, he could not stop Han Zhao, under its generals Liu Cong the Prince of Chu (the son of Han Zhao's emperor Liu Yuan, Liu Yao the Prince of Shi'an (Liu Yuan's nephew), Wang Mi (王彌), and Shi Le (石勒), from disrupting Jin rule throughout northern and central China and gradually wearing out Jin forces and capturing Jin cities and towns.  In late 309, he managed to fight off a joint attack by Liu Cong and Wang on Luoyang, but that victory was the exception to Han Zhao's inexorable advances.  After Liu Yuan died in 310 and was succeeded by Liu Cong, Han Zhao renewed its attacks on the Luoyang region.  Meanwhile, Sima Yue continued to alienate other generals and officials, and when Liu Kun (劉琨), the military commander of Bing (并州, roughly modern Shanxi) proposed to him the plan of an attack on the Han Zhao capital Pingyang (平陽, in modern Linfen, Shanxi) in conjunction with the powerful Xianbei chieftain Tuoba Yilu (拓拔漪盧) the Duke of Dai, Sima Yue was fearful of backstabbing attack by some of these warlords and therefore unable to accept Liu's plan.  Indeed, when Emperor Huai and Sima Yue sent out calls for the various governors to come to Luoyang's aid later that year, there were few responses.  Sima Yue became uncertain of himself, and late in 310 left Luoyang with virtually all of the central government's remaining troops, along with a large number of officials, effectively stripping Luoyang and Emperor Huai bare of their defenses, except for a small detachment commanded by Sima Yue's subordinate He Lun (何倫), intended as much to monitor as to protect Emperor Huai.  From that point on, Luoyang was left even without a police force and became largely a city abandoned to bandits and thugs.

Emperor Huai soon entered into a plan with Gou Xi (苟晞), the military commander of Qing Province (青州, modern central and eastern Shandong), who had been dissatisfied with Sima Yue, to overthrow Sima Yue's yoke.  Sima Yue discovered this plan, but was unable to wage a campaign against Xun.  He grew ill in his anger and distress, and died in spring 311.  The generals and officials in his army, instead of returning to Luoyang, headed east toward Sima Yue's principality of Donghai (roughly modern Linyi, Shandong) to bury him there.  He Lun, upon hearing about Sima Yue's death, also withdrew from Luoyang and sought to join that force.  However, both were intercepted by Shi Le and wiped out.  Shi, declaring that Sima Yue had caused the empire much damage, burned Sima Yue's body.  Sima Yue's sons were all captured and presumably killed by Shi.  Only Princess Pei fled, and after much suffering, including a stint where she was enslaved, she arrived in Jianye.  Because she had persuaded Sima Yue to let Sima Rui have the Jianye post, Sima Rui was grateful to her and honored both her and Sima Yue posthumously, and allowed her to adopt his son Sima Chong (司馬沖) to serve as Sima Yue's heir.

References

Fang, Xuanling. Book of Jin (Jin Shu).

Year of birth unknown
311 deaths
Jin dynasty (266–420) generals
Jin dynasty (266–420) imperial princes
Jin dynasty (266–420) regents
Chinese regicides